Abū Muḥammad ʿAbdallah ibn Muḥammad ibn ʿUmayr Maḥfūẓ al-Madini al-Balawī, commonly known as al-Balawī, was an Egyptian Arab historian of the 10th century (4th century AH). He belonged to the Arab tribe of Bali, a branch of Quda'a.

References

Islamic Chroniclers
10th-century Egyptian historians